Grey Hook is a historic home located at Poughkeepsie, Dutchess County, New York.  It was built in 1911 and is a 1-story, two-bay-wide concrete block Bungalow-style dwelling.  It features a roof that sweeps out over the porch with concrete block columns and balustrade.

It was added to the National Register of Historic Places in 1982.

References

Houses on the National Register of Historic Places in New York (state)
Houses completed in 1911
Houses in Poughkeepsie, New York
National Register of Historic Places in Poughkeepsie, New York